Michael George Elliott Turner (born 20 September 1938) is an English former professional football goalkeeper.

Football career

He was capped by England at youth level, but due to service in the RAF had to wait until December 1961 to turn professional when he joined Swindon Town from non-league Dorchester Town. He played 75 league games for Swindon and was part of Swindon's first ever promotion winning team in the 1962–63 season, before joining Torquay United in July 1964. He played 14 league games for Torquay over the next 2 seasons, before leaving the professional game.

He subsequently returned to Dorset, working for Plesseys for 20 years before retiring (in October 2006 he was living in Poole).

Turner is married with two children

References

1938 births
Living people
People from Bridport
Footballers from Dorset
English footballers
England youth international footballers
Association football goalkeepers
Dorchester Town F.C. players
Swindon Town F.C. players
Torquay United F.C. players
English Football League players